The Caravan Sites and Control of Development Act 1960 was an Act of the Parliament of the United Kingdom that regulated caravan sites.

Act
The Act was based on a 1959 report by Sir Arton Wilson on problems of people living in caravans, which found that the principal problem was the unclear and insufficient legislation on the matter, which gave neither local nor planning authorities powers to deal with caravan housing. As a result, the government brought in legislation regulating such housing, which was granted the Royal Assent on 29 July 1960 and came into force exactly a month later. The Act requires occupiers of land to gain a license before using that land as a caravan site, with the licensing authority being the local borough or district council. The license may be revoked, refused if the occupier has previously had a license revoked or contain such limitations as the council deem necessary. Violation of licensing terms bring a £100 fine for a first offence, and a £250 fine for any subsequent offences.

References

Bibliography

United Kingdom Acts of Parliament 1960